Henry To'oTo'o (born January 5, 2001) is an American football linebacker for the Alabama Crimson Tide. He previously played for the Tennessee Volunteers before transferring to Alabama in 2021.

Early life and high school career
To'oTo'o grew up in Sacramento, California, and attended De La Salle High School in Concord, California. He played both linebacker and running back at De La Salle and was named the Player of the Year by the Bay Area News Group as a senior. To'oTo'o committed to played college football at Tennessee over offers from Alabama, Oregon, USC and Washington.

College career

Tennessee 
To'oTo'o became a starting linebacker at Tennessee early in his true freshman season and was named to the Southeastern Conference (SEC) All-Freshman team after finishing second on the team with 72 tackles. He led the Volunteers with 76 tackles, 10 of which were for a loss, in his sophomore season. After the season, To'oTo'o announced that he would be entering the transfer portal.

Alabama 
To'oTo'o announced that he would be transferring to the University of Alabama after also considering Ohio State.

References

External links
Alabama Crimson Tide bio
Tennessee Volunteers bio

2001 births
Living people
Players of American football from Sacramento, California
American football linebackers
Alabama Crimson Tide football players
Tennessee Volunteers football players
De La Salle High School (Concord, California) alumni